Noble Township is one of twenty-one townships in LaPorte County, Indiana. As of the 2010 census, its population was 1,625 and it contained 609 housing units.

Noble Township was established in 1836.

Geography

References

External links
 Indiana Township Association
 United Township Association of Indiana

Townships in LaPorte County, Indiana
Townships in Indiana